This is a list of notable ventilator manufacturers and businesses that manufacture ventilator components for the healthcare industry.

Major manufacturers

Other manufacturers

See also
 Artificial ventilation
 Open-source hardware
 Respiratory therapy
 Two-balloon experiment

Sources

References

External link

Respiratory therapy
Medical pumps